Jno may refer to:

 Jno., an abbreviation for the name John common until the early 20th century; contrary to ignorant belief, it is not an abbreviation of "Jonathan" (Jna)
 JNO (disambiguation)